Julian Lloyd "Jules" Williams (born 23 July 1968) is a British writer, director, and producer. He has collaborated with best selling authors, he wrote both the Living The Life accompanying book and The Weigh Forward, and is the Director and Producer of Sky Arts 1 & Back Door Productions Living The Life.
In February 2009, Williams was invited to test the credibility of his profession when BBC's Newsnight ran a feature on the practice of remote viewing.

Television
Williams' career in television began when he moved to London to work on Psychic Today for Sky Television as a psychic and presenter. His interest in production led him to direct and produce his own television show Living the Life with Back Door Productions for Sky Arts. Jules worked alongside contributors including Stephen Fry, Robin Gibb, Joanna Lumley, John Hurt, Hans Zimmer, Elaine Paige and many others.

Williams is set to work alongside Nick Pope former head of the British Government's UFO program in Back Door Production's Contact Alien Hybrid.

Living The life
William's is the director and co-producer of the Sky Arts series Living The Life, now in its third season.

Season One
 Stephen Fry and Bill Wyman
 Melvyn Bragg and Joanna Lumley
 Leslie Phillips and Robin Gibb
 Dylan Jones and George Lamb
 Fay Weldon and Caitlin Moran
 Brigitte Nielsen and Britt Ekland
 Ian Botham and Sir Tim Rice
 Lord Sebastian Coe and Gary Newbon
 Sir Peter Blake and Ken Russell
 Charles Dance and Paul McGann
 Jeremy Clarkson and Nick Mason
 Cilla Black and Daniel O'Donnell
 Howard Marks and Peter Stringfellow

Season Two
 Nicholas Evans and James Nesbitt
 Anna Friel and Brenda Fricker
 Timothy West and Ken Livingstone
 Dame Monica Mason and Sir Derek Jacobi
 John Hurt and Sir Alan Parker
 Steven Berkoff and Martin Kemp
 Des O'Connor and Alan Davies
 Mary Quant and Alexandra Shulman
 Alan Yentob and Sir Salman Rushdie
 David Bailey and Tim Marlow

Season Three
 Dave Stewart and Elliott Gould
 Susan George and Robert Lindsay
 Gareth Edwards and Matthew Rhys
 Hans Zimmer and Derren Brown
 Marianne Faithfull and Ian La Frenais
 Jeffrey Archer and Sir Donald Sinden
 Lord Andrew Lloyd Webber and A. R. Rahman
 Elaine Paige and Twiggy

Writer
Williams contributes to magazines and newspapers such as Macs Magazine, Cover Media, Soho House, The Guardian Cardiff, and The Irish World. Jules Williams is a regular contributor to Natural Health Magazine, and is included as one of the publications panel of leading experts on matters of the mind, body and soul.

Williams' book The Weigh Forward posits subconscious blocks as the real reason that people hold on to weight at an increasing pace. The book is available in hard copy and for the Kindle

Williams' most recent release is Living The Life, the accompanying book to the hit Sky Arts Television Series of the same name. It was released in conjunction with Tesco Entertainment and Back Door Productions & Management.

Williams' also contributed to the children's book The Tree of Seasons helping to finish it after the untimely death of Boyzone member and writer Stephen Gately

References

Alumni of Bath Spa University
British television directors
British television producers
British television writers
People from Abergavenny
1968 births
British spiritual writers
Welsh writers
Welsh non-fiction writers
Welsh television producers
Welsh television writers
Living people
Anglo-Welsh writers
British male writers
British male television writers
Male non-fiction writers